The A851 road is one of the principal roads of the Isle of Skye in the Inner Hebrides off the west coast of mainland Scotland.

It connects the ferry port of Armadale on the south of the island with the A87 road for Portree and the Scottish mainland. It is just under 15 miles in length.

Settlements on or near the A851
North to South
Duisdalemore
Isleornsay
Knock
Teangue
Saasaig
Ferrindonald
Kilmore
Kilbeg
Ardvasar
Armadale

References 

Isle of Skye
Roads in Scotland